Chestnut Hill Avenue station is a light rail surface stop on the MBTA Green Line B branch, located in the median of Commonwealth Avenue just east of Chestnut Hill Avenue in the Brighton neighborhood of Boston, Massachusetts. Chestnut Hill Avenue has two low-level platforms, serving the B branch's two tracks; the stop is not accessible.

Just to the west of the station, there is a wye connecting the B branch to non-revenue tracks that run along Chestnut Hill Avenue to Reservoir Carhouse at Cleveland Circle. The tracks are used to supply the B branch with cars before rush hour, as the carhouse at Boston College has limited storage area. The leg of the wye leading from the westbound B branch to the non-revenue tracks is out of service and paved over.

History

On May 14, 2008, an outbound train derailed at Chestnut Hill Avenue. It struck a nearby utility pole, which brought down the overhead wires, causing the trolley to catch fire. No injuries were reported, but the trolley suffered significant damage.

Track work in 2018–19, which included replacement of platform edges at several stops, triggered requirements for accessibility modifications at those stops. By December 2022, design for Chestnut Hill Avenue and four other B Branch stops was 30% complete, with construction expected to last from fall 2023 to mid-2024.

References

External links 

MBTA – Chestnut Hill Avenue
 Station from Chestnut Hill Avenue from Google Maps Street View

Brighton, Boston
Green Line (MBTA) stations
Railway stations in Boston